Vitaly Shevchenko (born 1951) is a Russian football coach.

Vitaly Shevchenko may also refer to:

 Vitaly Shevchenko (journalist), Russia editor at BBC Monitoring